Telegraph Creek Water Aerodrome  is located  west southwest of Telegraph Creek, British Columbia, Canada.

See also
Telegraph Creek Airport

References

Seaplane bases in British Columbia
Regional District of Kitimat–Stikine
Registered aerodromes in British Columbia